Navas is a Spanish surname. Notable people with the surname include:

 Jesús Navas (born 1985), Spanish football player
 José Mario Ruiz Navas (1930–2020), Ecuadorian bishop
 Juan de Navas, Spanish composer
 Keylor Navas (born 1986), Costa Rican football player
 Longinos Navás (1858–1938), Spanish entomologist
 Luisa Eugenia Navas Chilean botanist
 Frédéric Navas Alonso de Castaneda, French civil servant
 George Ernest Navas, former U.S. Naval Officer and Pentagon (9-11) heroic personality

Spanish-language surnames